Carla Lalli Music is an American chef, cookbook author, and YouTube personality. She was a food editor at large of Bon Appétit and was known for her appearances in videos produced for the magazine's YouTube channel, most notably as the host of Back-to-Back Chef. Music left the magazine in 2020. This was in response to allegations that Bon Appétit and Condé Nast Entertainment engaged in racial discrimination.

Biography
Music was born to an Italian-American family, where her mother worked as a food critic at New West and as a cookbook editor at Simon & Schuster. Music studied at Brown University, where she graduated with a degree in Modern Culture and Media in 1994, and later attended the French Culinary Institute. She worked in food service for over a decade, notably as a line chef and later kitchen manager for Rocco DiSpirito, as the first general manager of Shake Shack, and as an instructor in culinary management at the Institute for Culinary Education. She transitioned to food writing in 2009, and served as an editor for Everyday Food until 2011. Music was hired as a features editor for Bon Appétit that same year, and was later promoted to be the magazine's food director. In January 2020, she moved her role to food editor at large to focus on her 2nd cookbook.

Music first appeared in videos on the Bon Appétit YouTube channel in 2015, and would make regular appearances in recipe preparation videos in the subsequent years. In 2018, Music became the host of Back-to-Back Chef, a web series in which she instructs a celebrity in preparing a dish while facing away from each other and using only verbal instructions. Notable guests on the series have included Natalie Portman, Michael Shannon, and Elizabeth Olsen. The series has been praised for its comedic timing and Music's hosting, with Vulture calling the Back-to-Back Chef "simple, elegant, and absolutely genius." Music was also featured in the series Test Kitchen Talks, From the Test Kitchen, and Making Perfect. In August 2020, two months after the resignation of editor-in-chief Adam Rapoport and the subsequent fallout regarding inequitable pay for staff and contributors of color, several members of the Test Kitchen, including Music, announced they would no longer film videos for the Bon Appétit YouTube channel due to a continued lack of progress in resolving issues at Condé Nast Entertainment.

A cookbook by Music, Where Cooking Begins: Uncomplicated Recipes to Make You a Great Cook, was published by Penguin Random House on March 19, 2019. In May 2020, the cookbook earned the 2020 James Beard Foundation Book Award in the category "General". Music announced she was working on a second cookbook in October 2019.

In November 2020, Music launched her own video series called Carla’s Cooking Show which is limited to her Patreon subscribers. In December 2020, Music launched a new collaborative Instagram Live series with Bon Appétit alumna Molly Baz called You Got Snack'd.

Music's second cookbook, That Sounds So Good: 100 Real-Life Recipes for Every Day of the Week, was released in October 2021, along with a new corresponding weekly YouTube series. Each weekly episode features Music cooking a recipe from the book.

Personal life
Music resides in Fort Greene, Brooklyn with her husband Fernando Music and two children. She is the daughter-in-law of deceased actor Lorenzo Music, who was the original voice of Jim Davis' comic strip character Garfield.

Works

Books

Web shows and series

References

External links
 Carla Lalli Music at Patreon
 Carla Lalli Music at Bon Appétit
 Back-to-Back Chef at Bon Appétit

Living people
American people of Italian descent
American YouTubers
Bon Appétit people
Brown University alumni
International Culinary Center alumni
James Beard Foundation Award winners
Women chefs
Year of birth missing (living people)